Robert Michael Nesmith (December 30, 1942 – December 10, 2021), often known as Mike Nesmith, was an American musician, songwriter, and actor. He was best known as a member of the pop rock band the Monkees and co-star of the TV series The Monkees (1966–1968). His songwriting credits include "Different Drum", which became a hit for Linda Ronstadt and the Stone Poneys.

After the break-up of the Monkees, Nesmith continued his successful songwriting and performing career, first with the seminal country rock group the First National Band, with whom he had a top-40 hit, "Joanne", and then as a solo artist. He often played a custom-built Gretsch 12-string electric with the Monkees and afterwards.

Nesmith founded Pacific Arts, a multimedia production and distribution company, in 1974, through which he helped pioneer the music video format. He created one of the first American television programs dedicated to music videos, PopClips, which aired on Nickelodeon in 1980. He was asked to help produce and create MTV, but had prior commitments with his production company. In 1981, he won the first Grammy Award for Video of the Year for his hour-long television show, Elephant Parts.
He was also an executive producer of the film Repo Man (1984).

Early life
Nesmith was born in Houston in 1942. He was an only child; his parents, Warren and Bette Nesmith (née McMurray), divorced when he was four. His mother married Robert Graham in 1962, and they remained married until 1975. Nesmith and his mother moved to Dallas to be closer to her family. She took temporary jobs ranging from clerical work to graphic design, eventually attaining the position of executive secretary at Texas Bank and Trust. When Nesmith was 13, his mother invented the typewriter correction fluid later known commercially as Liquid Paper. Over the next 25 years, she built the Liquid Paper Corporation into an international company, which she sold to Gillette in 1979 for $48 million. She died a few months later at the age of 56.

Nesmith attended Thomas Jefferson High School in Dallas, where he participated in choral and drama activities, but enlisted in the U.S. Air Force in 1960 before graduating. He completed basic training at Lackland Air Force Base in San Antonio, was trained as an aircraft mechanic at Sheppard Air Force Base in Wichita Falls, Texas, and was permanently stationed at Clinton-Sherman Air Force Base near Burns Flat, Oklahoma.  He obtained a GED certificate and was honorably discharged in 1962.

Music career

After Nesmith’s tour of duty in the Air Force, his mother and stepfather gave him a guitar for Christmas. Learning as he went, he played solo and in a series of working bands, performing folk, country, and occasionally rock and roll. He enrolled in San Antonio College, where he met John London and began a musical collaboration. They won the first San Antonio College talent award, performing a mixture of standard folk songs and a few of Nesmith's original songs. Nesmith began to write more songs and poetry, then he moved to Los Angeles and began singing in folk clubs around the city. He served as the "Hootmaster" for the Monday night hootenanny at The Troubadour, a West Hollywood nightclub that featured new artists.

Randy Sparks from the New Christy Minstrels offered Nesmith a publishing deal for his songs. Nesmith began his recording career in 1963 by releasing a single on the Highness label. He followed this in 1965 with a one-off single released on Edan Records followed by two more recorded singles; one was titled "The New Recruit" under the name "Michael Blessing", released on Colpix Records, coincidentally also the label of Davy Jones, though they did not meet until the Monkees formed.

Barry Freedman told him about upcoming auditions for a new TV series called The Monkees. In October 1965, Nesmith landed the role as the wool hat-wearing guitar player "Mike" in the show, which required real-life musical talent for writing, instrument playing, singing, and performing in live concerts as part of the Monkees band.

Nesmith's "Mary, Mary" was recorded by the Paul Butterfield Blues Band, The Monkees themselves on their second LP in 1967, and then reworked by rap group Run DMC in the mid 1980s. His "Different Drum" and "Some of Shelly's Blues" were later recorded by Linda Ronstadt and the Stone Poneys in 1967 and 1968, respectively. "Pretty Little Princess", written in 1965, was recorded by Frankie Laine and released as a single in 1968 on ABC Records.  Later, "Some of Shelly's Blues" and "Propinquity (I've Just Begun to Care)" were made popular by the Nitty Gritty Dirt Band on their 1970 album Uncle Charlie & His Dog Teddy.

The Monkees

From 1965 to early 1970, Nesmith was a member of the television pop-rock band the Monkees, created for the television situation comedy of the same name. Nesmith won his role largely by appearing nonchalant when he auditioned. He rode his motorcycle to the audition, and wore a wool hat to keep his hair out of his eyes; producers Bob Rafelson and Bert Schneider remembered the "wool hat guy" and called Nesmith back.

Once he was cast, Screen Gems bought his songs so they could be used in the show. Many of the songs Nesmith wrote for the Monkees, such as "The Girl I Knew Somewhere", "Mary, Mary", and "Listen to the Band" became minor hits. One song he wrote, "You Just May Be the One", is in mixed meter, interspersing 5/4 bars into an otherwise 4/4 structure.

Even before Colgems and Don Kirshner's surreptitious release of the Monkees 2nd LP, without the knowledge or consent of the four musician-actors, they came to be frustrated by their studio-manufactured "bubblegum" image. Within weeks of the release of More of the Monkees, Nesmith lobbied successfully with the group's creators, Bob Rafelson and Bert Schneider, that the Monkees be allowed to play their instruments on future records. 
During a group meeting with Kirshner and Colgems lawyer Herb Moelis, in a suite at the Beverly Hills Hotel, each actor received a $250k royalties check, yet Nesmith still threatened to quit. Moelis rebuked him, "You'd better read your contract". Nesmith defiantly punched a hole in the wall, declaring to Moelis, "That could have been your face, motherfucker!" Weeks later, due to a breach of (verbal) agreement over the next single release, which was promised to Nesmith by Rafelson & Schneider, Nesmith led the charge in completely ousting musical supervisor Don Kirshner, effectively giving the four youths complete artistic and production control of their output, and the group finally worked as a true 4-man rock group on 1967's Headquarters, despite Jones & Dolenz having very limited instrumental skills, studio time being pricey and retakes costly.

During the band's first independent press conference, Nesmith called their 2nd LP, More of the Monkees "probably the worst record in the history of the world", partly due to rushed, shoddy studio engineering. The band took a hit to its artistic credibility when fans learned the four had not played all the instruments on the first 2 LPs. But still sales continued to be profitable. Headquarters sold 2 million copies, down 2 million units from its predecessor, but still reached the number 1 spot on Billboard, falling only to Sgt. Pepper's Lonely Hearts Club Band a week later and remaining #2 all through the entire 1967 Summer of Love.

For the remaining five Monkees LPs, ironically, the original Kirshner formula of hired studio musicians & songwriters again became the norm, although Nesmith, Tork, Dolenz and Jones contributed about 50% of the original compositions, Nesmith the majority of those.
By the end of the Monkees run, Nesmith was withholding many of his original song ideas from Monkees albums, planning to release them in his post-Monkees solo career. 
Nesmith's last contractual Monkees commitment was a commercial for Kool-Aid and Nerf balls in April 1970 (fittingly, the spot ends with Nesmith frowning and saying, "Enerf's enerf!"). As the band's sales declined, Nesmith asked to be released from his contract, despite it costing him: "I had three years left ... at $150,000 [equivalent to $980,940 in 2018] a year." He remained in a financial bind until 1980, when he received his inheritance from his mother's estate. In a 1980 interview with Playboy, he said of that time: "I had to start telling little tales to the tax man while they were putting tags on the furniture."

Return to the Monkees
Nesmith did not participate in the Monkees' 20th anniversary reunion, due to contractual obligations with his production company, but he did appear during an encore with the three other Monkees at the Greek Theatre on September 7, 1986. In a 1987 interview for Nick Rocks, Nesmith stated, "When Peter called up and said 'we're going to go out, do you want to go?' I was booked. But, if you get to L.A., I'll play."

Nesmith next joined his fellow Monkees for the 1986 "Monkees Christmas Medley" video for MTV appearing throughout dressed/disguised as Santa Claus until the finale, when he revealed his identity - and participation - to all.

Nesmith appeared again in 1989 with the other members of the Monkees, Micky Dolenz, Peter Tork, and Davy Jones. Prior to the official kickoff of The Monkees '89 tour (on July 1 in Winnipeg, Manitoba, Canada) all four Monkees gathered in Los Angeles, California, making two live radio appearances (KLOS-FM: The Mark and Brian Show on June 28 and KIIS Radio on June 30) to promote their reunion concert at the Universal Amphitheatre where they appeared together as a foursome live on stage on July 9. The following day (July 10th) all four band members were in attendance as the Monkees received a Hollywood Walk of Fame star.

In 1995, Nesmith was again reunited with the Monkees to record their studio album (and first to feature all four since Head), titled Justus, released in 1996. He also wrote and directed a Monkees television special, Hey, Hey, It's the Monkees. To support the reunion, Nesmith, Jones, Dolenz, and Tork briefly toured the UK in 1997.  The UK tour was the last appearance of all four Monkees performing together.

In 2012, 2013, and 2014, after Jones's death, Nesmith reunited with Dolenz and Tork to perform concerts throughout the United States.  Backed with a seven-piece band that included Nesmith's son, Christian, the trio performed 27 songs from The Monkees discography ("Daydream Believer" was sung by the audience). When asked why he had decided to return to the Monkees, Nesmith stated, "I never really left. It is a part of my youth that is always active in my thoughts and part of my overall work as an artist. It stays in a special place."

In 2016, Nesmith contributed vocally and instrumentally to the Monkees' 50th anniversary album Good Times!. He additionally contributed a song, "I Know What I Know", and was reportedly "thrilled" at the outcome of the album. Despite not touring with Dolenz and Tork for the majority of the Monkees' 50th-anniversary reunion in 2016, Nesmith did twice fill in for the ailing Peter Tork and appeared for the final show of the tour, which featured the three surviving band members (the last show to do so). At the end of the final show, Nesmith announced his retirement from the Monkees, never to tour again.

In 2018, Nesmith and Dolenz toured together as a duo for the first time under the banner "The Monkees Present: The Mike and Micky Show". The tour was cut short four dates out due to Nesmith having health issues (he was flown back home and proceeded to have quadruple bypass surgery). He contributed two songs to the Monkees' 13th studio album, Christmas Party (the group's first Christmas album), released on October 12, 2018.

In 2019, Nesmith and Dolenz reunited again to make up the cancelled dates of the tour and adding several more dates, including a planned tour of Australia and New Zealand. Nesmith and Dolenz announced a follow-up tour, "An Evening with the Monkees", to begin in early 2020. The tour was delayed, however, due the COVID-19 pandemic. It was announced by Nesmith and Dolenz on May 4, 2021, that the Monkees would disband following a farewell tour. Dubbed "The Monkees Farewell Tour", the tour consisted of over 40 dates in the United States from September to November. However, because of restrictions due to the ongoing COVID-19 pandemic, they were not able to play shows in Canada, the UK or Australia. The final date of the tour was held on November 14, 2021, at the Greek Theatre in Los Angeles.

Solo career
As he prepared for his exit from The Monkees, Nesmith was approached by John Ware of The Corvettes, a band that featured Nesmith's Texas band mate and close friend John London. London played on some of the earliest pre-Monkees, Nesmith 45s, as well as numerous Monkees sessions, and had 45s produced by Nesmith for the Dot label in 1969. Ware wanted Nesmith to put together a band. Nesmith's interest hinged on noted pedal steel player Orville "Red" Rhodes; their musical partnership continued until Rhodes's death in 1995. The new band was christened Michael Nesmith and the First National Band and recorded three albums for RCA Records, the first two being released in 1970 with the third seeing release in 1971.

Nesmith's First National Band is now considered a pioneer of country-rock music. Nesmith wrote most of the songs for the band and he, himself, is considered one of the trailblazers of country rock. He also had moderate commercial success with the First National Band. Their second single, "Joanne", hit number 21 on the Billboard chart, number 17 on Cashbox, and number four in Canada, with the follow-up "Silver Moon" making number 42 Billboard, number 28 Cashbox, and number 13 in Canada. Two more singles charted ("Nevada Fighter" made number 70 Billboard, number 73 Cashbox, and number 67 Canada, and "Propinquity" reached number 95 Cashbox), and the first two LPs charted in the lower regions of the Billboard album chart. No clear answer has ever been given for the band's breakup.

Nesmith followed up with The Second National Band, which consisted of Nesmith (vocals and guitar), Michael Cohen (keyboards and Moog), Johnny Meeks (of The Strangers) (bass), jazzer Jack Ranelli (drums), and Orville Rhodes (pedal steel), as well as an appearance by singer, musician, and songwriter José Feliciano on congas. The album, Tantamount to Treason Vol. 1, was a commercial and critical disaster. Nesmith then recorded And the Hits Just Keep on Comin', featuring only him on guitar and Red Rhodes on pedal steel.

Nesmith then became more heavily involved in producing, working on Iain Matthews's album Valley Hi and Bert Jansch's L.A. Turnaround. Nesmith was given a label of his own, Countryside, through Elektra Records, as Elektra Records's Jac Holzman was a fan of Nesmith's. It featured a number of artists produced by Nesmith, including Garland Frady and Red Rhodes. The staff band at Countryside also helped Nesmith on his next, and last, RCA album, Pretty Much Your Standard Ranch Stash.  Countryside folded when David Geffen replaced Holzman, as Countryside was unnecessary in Geffen's eyes.

In the mid-1970s, Nesmith briefly collaborated as a songwriter with Linda Hargrove, resulting in the tune "I've Never Loved Anyone More", a hit for Lynn Anderson and recorded by many others, as well as the songs "Winonah" and "If You Will Walk With Me", both of which were recorded by Hargrove. Of these songs, only "Winonah" was recorded by Nesmith himself. During this same period, Nesmith started his multimedia company Pacific Arts, which initially put out audio records, eight-track tapes, and cassettes, followed in 1981 with "video records".  Nesmith recorded a number of LPs for his label, and had a moderate worldwide hit in 1977 with his song "Rio", the single taken from the album From a Radio Engine to the Photon Wing. In 1979, Nesmith released the single Cruisin', also known as "Lucy and Ramona and Sunset Sam", which was popular on AOR rock stations and in New Zealand. In 1983, Nesmith produced the music video for the Lionel Richie single "All Night Long". In 1987, he produced the music video for the Michael Jackson single "The Way You Make Me Feel".

PopClips and MTV, Elephant Parts, and Television Parts

During this time, Nesmith created a video clip for "Rio", which helped spur Nesmith's creation of a television program called PopClips for the Nickelodeon cable network. In 1980, PopClips was sold to the Time Warner/Amex consortium. Time Warner/Amex developed PopClips into the MTV network.

Nesmith won the first Grammy Award given for (long-form) Music Video in 1982 for his hour-long Elephant Parts.  He also had a short-lived series (1984-5) on NBC inspired by the video called Michael Nesmith in Television Parts. Television Parts included many other artists who were unknown at the time, but went on to become major stars in their own right: Jay Leno, Jerry Seinfeld, Garry Shandling, Whoopi Goldberg, and Arsenio Hall. The concept of the show was to have comics render their stand-up routines into short comedy films much like the ones in Elephant Parts. Nesmith assembled writers Jack Handey, William Martin, John Levenstein, and Michael Kaplan, along with directors William Dear (who had directed Elephant Parts) and Alan Myerson, as well as producer Ward Sylvester to create the show. The half-hour show ran for 5 episodes in the summer of 1985 on NBC Thursday nights in prime time.

Pacific Arts and legal dispute

Nesmith formed the Pacific Arts Corporation, Inc. in 1974 to manage and develop media projects. Pacific Arts Video became a pioneer in the home video market, producing and distributing a wide variety of videotaped programs, although the company eventually ceased operations after an acrimonious contract dispute with PBS over home video licensing rights and payments for several series, including Ken Burns' The Civil War. The dispute escalated into a lawsuit that went to jury trial in federal court in Los Angeles. On February 3, 1999, a jury awarded Nesmith and his company Pacific Arts $48.875 million in compensatory and punitive damages, prompting his widely quoted comment, "It's like finding your grandmother stealing your stereo. You're happy to get your stereo back, but it's sad to find out your grandmother is a thief." PBS appealed the ruling, but the appeal never reached court and a settlement was reached, with the amount paid to Pacific Arts and Nesmith kept confidential.

Nesmith's most recent Pacific Arts project was Videoranch 3D, a virtual environment on the internet that hosted live performances at various virtual venues inside the ranch. He performed live inside Videoranch 3D on May 25, 2009.

Movies and books
Nesmith was the executive producer for the films Repo Man, Tapeheads, and Timerider: The Adventure of Lyle Swann, as well as his own solo recording and film projects.

In 1998, Nesmith published his first novel, The Long Sandy Hair of Neftoon Zamora. It was developed originally as an online project and was later published as a hardcover book by St Martin's Press. Nesmith's second novel, The America Gene, was released in July 2009 as an online download from Videoranch.com.

Recent history
In the early 1980s, Nesmith teamed with satirist P. J. O'Rourke to ride his vehicle Timerider in the annual Baja 1000 off-road race. This is chronicled in O'Rourke's 2009 book Driving Like Crazy.

During the 1990s, Nesmith, as trustee and president of the Gihon Foundation, hosted the Council on Ideas, a gathering of intellectuals from different fields who were asked to identify the most important issues of their day and publish the result. The foundation ceased the program in 2000 and started a new program for the performing arts. Nesmith also spent a decade as a board of trustees member, nominating member and vice-chair of the American Film Institute.

In 1992, Nesmith undertook a concert tour of North America to promote the CD release of his RCA solo albums (although he included the song "Rio" from the album From a Radio Engine to the Photon Wing). The concert tour ended at the Britt Festival in Oregon. A video and CD, both entitled Live at the Britt Festival, were released capturing the 1992 concert.

Nesmith continued to record and release his own music. His final album, Rays, was released in 2006. In 2011, he returned to producing, working with blues singer and guitarist Carolyn Wonderland. Nesmith produced Wonderland's version of Robert Johnson's "I Believe I'll Dust My Broom" on her album Peace Meal. Wonderland married writer-comedian A. Whitney Brown on March 4, 2011, in a ceremony officiated by Nesmith.

In 2012, Nesmith briefly toured Europe prior to rejoining the Monkees for their tours of the United States. Intermixing the Monkees concerts, Nesmith also launched solo tours of the U.S. Unlike his 1992 U.S. tour, which predominantly featured music from his RCA recordings, Nesmith stated that his 2013 tour would feature songs he considers "thematic, chronological and most often requested by fans". Chris Scruggs, grandson of Earl Scruggs, replaced the late Red Rhodes on the steel guitar. The tour was captured on a live album, Movies Of The Mind.

In 2014, he guest-starred in season four, episode nine, of the IFC comedy series Portlandia in the fictitious role of the father of the mayor of Portland, Oregon.

In 2017, he released a memoir and companion "soundtrack" album titled Infinite Tuesday: An Autobiographical Riff.

In 2018, he announced that he would be doing a five-date tour of California with a revamped version of The First National Band, including a date at The Troubadour, where he performed before The Monkees. On February 20, a tour was announced as "The Monkees Present: The Mike and Micky Show", their first tour as a duo. The pair would play Monkees music and promote the tour under the Monkees banner, but Nesmith stated, "there's no pretense there about Micky and I [sic] being the Monkees. We're not." The tour was cut short in June 2018, with four shows left unplayed, due to Nesmith having a "minor health issue";  Dolenz and he rescheduled the unplayed concerts plus adding several other including an Australian tour in 2019.
After recovering from his health scare, Michael Nesmith and the First National Band Redux went on a tour of the U.S., with mostly the same lineup and setlist as the southern California shows.

In 2019, Nesmith toured in a two-piece configuration with pedal steel player Pete Finney, focusing on his 1972 album, And the Hits Just Keep on Comin'. This was the first time Nesmith had performed in this format since 1974 with Red Rhodes. Nesmith was also joined by special guests Ben Gibbard and Scott McCaughey on opening night in Seattle.

Personal life

Nesmith was married three times and had four children.

He met his first wife, Phyllis Ann Barbour, in 1964, while at San Antonio College. Together, they had three children: Christian, born in 1965; Jonathan, born in 1968; and Jessica, born in 1970. Nesmith and Barbour divorced in 1972.

Nesmith also had a son, Jason, born in August 1968 to Nurit Wilde, whom he met while working on The Monkees.

In 1976, he married his second wife, Kathryn Bild.

In 2000, he married his third wife, Victoria Kennedy, but the marriage ended in divorce in 2011.

When the Monkees' TV series ended in 1968, Nesmith enrolled part-time at the University of California, Los Angeles, where he studied American history and music history. In 1973, Nesmith founded the Countryside Records label with Jac Holzman, the founder of Elektra Records. In 1974, Nesmith started Pacific Arts Records and released what he called "a book with a soundtrack", titled The Prison, as the company's first release.

Health and death
Nesmith was forced to cancel the last four dates of his 2018 tour with Micky Dolenz due to a "minor health scare". In an interview with Rolling Stone published on July 26 of that year, Nesmith said he had undergone quadruple bypass heart surgery, and had been hospitalized for over a month.

Nesmith died from heart failure at his home in Carmel Valley, California, on December 10, 2021, at the age of 78. Dolenz memorialized Nesmith as "a dear friend and partner."

Discography
Source:
 The Wichita Train Whistle Sings (1968)
 Magnetic South (1970)
 Loose Salute (1970)
 Nevada Fighter (1971)
 Tantamount to Treason Vol. 1 (1972)
 And the Hits Just Keep on Comin' (1972)
 Pretty Much Your Standard Ranch Stash (1973)
 The Prison: A Book with a Soundtrack (1974) (soundtrack)
 From a Radio Engine to the Photon Wing (1977)
 Infinite Rider on the Big Dogma (1979)
 Tropical Campfires (1992)
 The Garden (1994) (soundtrack)
 Timerider: The Adventure of Lyle Swann (2000) (soundtrack, recorded 1980)
 Rays (2005)
 The Ocean (2015)

Filmography

Television

Films

Home video

Books
(n.b. books proper – not including The Prison and The Garden)
The Long Sandy Hair of Neftoon Zamora (1998)
The America Gene (2009)
Infinite Tuesday: An Autobiographical Riff (2017)

Audiobooks
The Long Sandy Hair of Neftoon Zamora (2004) (with Nesmith reading the story)
Infinite Tuesday: An Autobiographical Riff (2017) (narrated by Nesmith)

References

Further reading
Article in Wired magazine about Michael Nesmith and the Council on Ideas
Michael Nesmith biography
(Unofficial) Michael Nesmith home page
SWINDLE Magazine interview

Michael Nesmith: Overcoming The Monkees at NPR.com
Michael Nesmith interview 2013
Michael Nesmith Interview NAMM Oral History Library (2019)

External links

Videoranch, a Michael Nesmith company

Nesmith at Allmusic.com

 
1942 births
2021 deaths
20th-century American guitarists
20th-century American male writers
20th-century American novelists
21st-century American male writers
21st-century American novelists
American Christian Scientists
American country guitarists
American country rock singers
American film producers
American male film actors
American male guitarists
American male novelists
American male singer-songwriters
American male stage actors
American male television actors
American philanthropists
American pop guitarists
American pop rock singers
American rock guitarists
Businesspeople from Texas
Country musicians from Texas
Deaths from congestive heart failure
Grammy Award winners
Guitarists from Texas
Lead guitarists
Male actors from Houston
Military personnel from Houston
Musicians from Dallas
Musicians from Houston
Novelists from Texas
People from Carmel Valley Village, California
Singer-songwriters from California
Singer-songwriters from Texas
The Monkees members
Thomas Jefferson High School (Dallas) alumni
United States Air Force airmen
The First National Band members